In the Shadow of the Sun is an improvised musical score by Throbbing Gristle for the 1981 Derek Jarman film of the same name.

Background 

In the Shadow of the Sun is an improvised musical score for the film of the same name by Derek Jarman. Throbbing Gristle founder Genesis P-Orridge called the film "ambient video", used to "enhance or complete an environment."

Musical style 

Simon Ford, author of the Throbbing Gristle biography Wreckers of Civilisation: The Story of COUM Transmissions & Throbbing Gristle, opined that both the movie and its accompanying soundtrack "revelled in distortion, chance and formlessness."

Live performances 

Throbbing Gristle played a new version of the soundtrack live during their April 2009 United States tour.

Psychic TV performed a reinterpreted version of the soundtrack live along with a screening of the film at Cafe Oto in London during their spring 2017 European tour.

Critical reception 

The Wire described the soundtrack as "dark and mournful".

Track listing

Charts

Bibliography

References 

1984 soundtrack albums
Fantasy film soundtracks
Throbbing Gristle soundtracks
Mute Records soundtracks